Ruth Richardson (born November 27, 1976) is an American politician serving in the Minnesota House of Representatives since 2019. A member of the Minnesota Democratic–Farmer–Labor Party (DFL), Richardson represents District 52B in the southeastern Twin Cities metropolitan area, which includes the cities of Eagan and Mendota Heights and parts of Dakota County, Minnesota.

Early life, education, and career
Richardson graduated from the University of Minnesota with a Bachelor of Arts in history and sociology and from William Mitchell College of Law with a Juris Doctor.

Richardson was previously the director of programs and national strategic initiatives for the Minnesota Organization on Fetal Alcohol Syndrome and was the CEO of Wayside Recovery Center. Richardson currently is the CEO of Planned Parenthood North Central States.

Minnesota House of Representatives
Richardson was first elected to the Minnesota House of Representatives in 2018, defeating Republican incumbent Regina Barr and has been reelected every two years since. 

In 2020, Representative Richardson, alongside five other state representatives and three state senators, had her election results challenged. These claims were dismissed by a judge for failing to state a claim and a lack of subject-matter jurisdiction.

During the 2021-2022 legislative session, Richardson served as chair of the Education Policy Committee. Currently she serves on the Economic Development Finance and Policy Committee. 

Richardson authored legislation to make Juneteenth an official state holiday in Minnesota, which passed the House on a vote of 126-1 and was signed by Governor Walz in February 2023.

Electoral history

Personal life
Richardson has two children and resides in Mendota Heights, Minnesota.

References

External links

 Official House of Representatives website
 Official campaign website

1970s births
Living people
Democratic Party members of the Minnesota House of Representatives
21st-century American politicians
21st-century American women politicians
Women state legislators in Minnesota
University of Minnesota College of Liberal Arts alumni
William Mitchell College of Law alumni
American women chief executives